Alex John Groza (October 7, 1926 – January 21, 1995) was an American professional basketball player from Martins Ferry, Ohio. Resulting from the CCNY point shaving scandal, Groza was banned from the National Basketball Association (NBA) for life in 1951. In college, he won two NCAA championships as captain of the University of Kentucky Wildcats, and was a two-time All-NBA player for the Indianapolis Olympians before his career abruptly ended.

Early life
Groza grew up in Martins Ferry, Ohio and attended Martins Ferry High School. He was the brother of future Pro Football Hall-of-Famer Lou Groza.

Alex Groza led the Purple Riders to two undefeated regular seasons and to the Ohio state tournament both years, as Martins Ferry finished 24–1 in 1943 and 26–1 in 1944. In 1944, he scored 628 points, including 41 in one game, and was named first-team All-Ohio.

College career

Groza was the captain and center of the "Fabulous Five" that won the 1948 and 1949 NCAA Men's Basketball Championships, as well as the leading scorer on the gold medal-winning 1948 US Olympic basketball team. Groza was three-time All-American and All-SEC, and two-time NCAA Final Four Most Outstanding Player.

Professional career

Indianapolis Olympians (1949–1951) 
Groza was drafted in the 1st round of the 1949 NBA draft by the Indianapolis Olympians. Groza averaged 23.4 points per game in his rookie season and was named NBA Rookie of the Year. Because the award was selected by newspaper writers at the time, the NBA currently does not recognize Groza having won the award. He averaged 22.5 points per game over two seasons before being implicated along with college teammates Ralph Beard and Dale Barnstable in a point shaving scandal during the 1948–49 season at Kentucky. NBA president Maurice Podoloff banned all of the implicated players from the league for life.

As a result of this ban, Groza became the first player in NBA history to end his career with a season in which he averaged at least 20 points per game (Groza averaged 21.7 PPG during the 1950–51).  In NBA history, only three players have had higher scoring averages in their final NBA seasons: Bob Pettit (22.5 PPG in '64–65), Paul Arizin (21.9 PPG in '61–62), and Dražen Petrović (22.3 PPG in '92–93).

NBA career statistics

Regular season

Playoffs

Coaching career
After his playing career ended, Groza became the coach of Bellarmine College (now University) in Louisville, Kentucky. In 1963, Groza led the Knights to a Kentucky Intercolliegiate Athletic Conference title and was named KIAC coach of the year. Groza left Bellarmine in 1966 for a brief coaching and managerial career in the American Basketball Association. Between 1971 and 1975, Groza coached 40 games with the Kentucky Colonels and San Diego Conquistadors and held a number of front office positions, including becoming the Kentucky Colonels' business manager in 1969 and general manager of the San Diego Conquistadors in 1972 (and, later, San Diego's head coach). Groza was 2–0 as coach of the Colonels but 15–23 as coach of the Conquistadors after replacing Wilt Chamberlain in 1974, putting his career coaching record at 17–23. He was named general manager of the expansion Conquistadors on August 8, 1972. In 1975 Groza became director of player development for the San Diego Sails of the ABA. After the Sails folded, he was named vice president and general manager of the San Diego Breakers of the International Volleyball Association on April 5, 1976.

Personal life
After the team moved to Houston, Groza remained in San Diego, working as a sales manager for Reynolds International until his death.

Alex Groza died of cancer in 1995 at age 68. He was survived by his wife of 42 years, Jean (Watson) Groza, two sons, two daughters, and two grandchildren.

Miscellaneous
Groza led the league in field goal percentage in 1950 and 1951.
Alex Groza was the brother of American football hall of fame placekicker Lou Groza.
Groza's nickname was "The Beak".

References

External links

Alex Groza player statistics at Basketball-Reference.com
Alex Groza coach statistics at Basketball-Reference.com
Alex Groza – UK Career Statistics and Biography

1926 births
1995 deaths
20th-century American businesspeople
All-American college men's basketball players
Amateur Athletic Union men's basketball players
American Basketball Association executives
American men's basketball players
Banned National Basketball Association players
Basketball coaches from Ohio
Basketball players at the 1948 Summer Olympics
Basketball players from Ohio
American people of Hungarian descent
American people of Romanian descent
Bellarmine Knights baseball coaches
Bellarmine Knights men's basketball coaches
Centers (basketball)
Indianapolis Olympians draft picks
Indianapolis Olympians players
Kentucky Colonels coaches
Kentucky Colonels executives
Kentucky Wildcats men's basketball players
Medalists at the 1948 Summer Olympics
National Basketball Association All-Stars
Olympic gold medalists for the United States in basketball
People from Martins Ferry, Ohio
San Diego Conquistadors coaches
San Diego Conquistadors executives
Sportspeople involved in betting scandals
United States men's national basketball team players